In the UK Highway Code, a built-up area is a settled area in which the speed limit of a road is automatically 30 mph (48 km/h). These roads are known as 'restricted roads' and are identified by the presence of street lights.

History 
In 1930, the concept of specific regulation for roads within built-up areas appears. It defines the road as a road within built-up area if some system of street lighting exists at less than 200 yards (183 meters) from that road, unless decided other way by the local authority and written on traffic signs.

The Road Traffic Regulation Act 1984 is the basis of the current law.

In 2018, mainland UK became a member of the Vienna convention on road traffic which consider that the concept of built-up area should be defined by the domestic legislation.

Legal definition
In August 2006, the Department for Transport issued new guidance relating to speed limits. It states that:

"Street lighting" is further defined as follows:

To avoid confusion that could arise if some 30 mph zones were 'street-lit' and some were not, DfT guidance goes onto say:

This has led to the conclusion that:

British Standards on "Road Lighting" are contained in the following documents: BS EN13201-1-2004; BS 5489:1:2003

Legislation
Most road traffic law pertaining to speed limits is contained in the Road Traffic Regulation Act 1984 (RTRA 1984). Other relevant legislation includes the Highways Act 1980, where Sections 90A-F cover road humps and Sections 90G-I cover other traffic-calming works. Part VI of the RTRA 1984 deals specifically with speed limits, with Sections 81–84 dealing with different speed limits and the speed-limit order-making process.

Highway Code in Northern Ireland
In Northern Ireland, the Highway Code of Northern Ireland has only three references to the "built-up area" and does not define it.

In Northern Ireland, the Highway Code forbids the use of the horn within built-up area between 2330 and 0700, except in case of danger, consistently with article 28 of the Vienna convention.

In Northern Ireland, the Highway Code forbids speeds higher than 30 mph in built-up areas.

See also
Built-up area
Speed limit

References

External links 
Department for Transport: DfT Circular 01/2006, Setting Local Speed Limits 
 Highway Code Rule 103: Speed limits
Dept. Of Transport: Manual for Streets (2007)
British Stands: Road Lighting

Road transport in the United Kingdom